The Antique Gas & Steam Engine Museum (AGSEM) is a living-history museum founded in 1969 located on  of county-owned land on the outskirts of Vista, California.  The museum is a non-profit 501c(3) organization. It is located at 2040 N Santa Fe Ave. in Vista. It is run by several paid employees, along with volunteer help.

The museum is open almost every day of the year and has two bi-annual shows, on the 3rd and 4th weekends of June and October. The museum also has other public and private events throughout the year.

Exhibits at the museum include:

Technology museum 
Gas Engine Row has many large stationary gas engines from the early 1900s. On the row is an operational  Fairbanks-Morse mine hoist winding engine, a pumphouse powered by a  Fairbanks-Morse engine, a  horsepower 1922 Fairbanks-Morse type YV engine connected to a large alternator, an enormous 1914 Chicago-Pneumatic hot-bulb air compressor, an  Western engine, a  Western engine, a  Western engine and many other stationary engines. Almost all of the engines on Gas Engine Row can be seen running during the shows.

Steam Engine Row showcases many different types and sizes of stationary steam engines; from a monstrous  Allis Chalmers Corliss engine with a  flywheel, to a small J. Lefel & Sons portable engine. They are all powered by steam from two large boilers, nicknamed Pat and Rich, after two long-time museum volunteers who maintain and operate them.

Steam engines 
There are six operational steam traction engines on the grounds, with a 1913 Buffalo-Pitts steamroller and a 1909 20 horsepower Case undergoing restoration. The operational steam tractors are an 1895 Russell & Co. 15-30 steam tractor, a 1902 Advance 16-30 steam tractor, a 1912 J.I. Case  steam tractor, a 1920 Minneapolis  steam tractor, and a 1916 15-30 Russell & Co. Most, if not all, of these tractors can be seen steaming around the grounds during the show days.

Tractors 
The museum is also home to a large number of old tractors. Two D8 Caterpillars, a D9, a few large 1930s Caterpillars, some Best crawlers and many other examples of tracked tractors can be seen at the museum. The typical tractors such as Farmall, John Deere, Oliver, and Allis-Chalmers can be seen out at the museum, but there are more than a few rarer examples too. There is a 1924 Buffalo-Springfield road roller, a gigantic 1918 30-60 Aultman-Taylor gas tractor, a 1911 Fairbanks-Morse 15-25 kerosene tractor, a 1915 International Harvester Mogul 8-16, several Rumely Oil-Pulls, and many more.

Blacksmithing 
There is an operational blacksmith shop with an operating line shaft setup powered by a 15-horsepower 1917 Mogul gasoline engine. During the show days, there are multiple forges lit, and multiple blacksmiths can be found working pieces of iron into many different things.

Model Railroad 
Also located on museum grounds is the Short Track Model Railroad Club, featuring an NTrak model railroad with trains traveling through more than 40 modules, including a drive-in movie theater, a fairgrounds, farms, towns, and a coal mine and other scenes. 

The Short Track, N-Scale, Model Railroad club is an educational organization that seeks to further the appreciation of railroad history in the United States.  Many members are also National Model Railroad Association (NMRA) members and a few have earned the title of "Master Modeler."  Their Donner Pass, N-scale, model railroad exhibit shows the Southern Pacific crossing of the Sierra Mountains between Colfax, CA and West Reno, NV.

There is also a small layout that can be operated by children (The Young & Victorious RR).

Textile museum 
The Museum Weavers are housed in a  barn, featuring more than 50 working looms for weaving. Members of this club meet weekly to learn and practice weaving, rug-making and rope-making.

Mill museum 
The working gristmill grinds wheat and corn into flour, which is available for sale during the twice-yearly shows. During the summer months, the museum grows sorghum cane, which is made into molasses for the fall show.

Sawmill 
The Sawmill is run by a D-3000 Cat diesel engine, Hawthorne Machinery in San Diego provided the cylinder liners. The Sawmill was re-assembled and improved following a donation from the Pederson Brothers who had operated it in the Big Bear area years ago. This is likely the only Sawmill that can be seen operating in San Diego County.

See also
Category: Museums in San Diego County

References
Official site
Big Blend Magazine article

Museums established in 1969
American West museums in California
Technology museums in California
Farm museums in California
Open-air museums in California
Textile museums in the United States
Mill museums in California
Transportation museums in California
Museums in San Diego County, California
Weaving
History of metallurgy
Schoolhouses in the United States
Steam museums in the United States
1969 establishments in California
Gas museums
Vista, California